The 2019 Basketball Champions League (BCL) Final Four was the third Basketball Champions League tournament. It was the concluding phase of the 2018–19 Basketball Champions League season.

Venue
The Sportpaleis hosted the final tournament for the first time.

Teams

Road to the Final Four

Background

Telenet Giants Antwerp
Antwerp qualified for its first ever final phase of a European competition and were the second team ever to reach the final four after playing all qualifying rounds, after Riesen Ludwigsburg in 2018. In its domestic Pro Basketball League (PBL), Antwerp was having a terrific year as it was in second position. In 2018–19, Antwerp also won its first Belgian Basketball Cup in history.

Segafredo Virtus Bologna
Bologna qualified for the Champions League as the ninth best team in the Italian Lega Basket Serie A (LBA). In its 2018–19 domestic season, it was in eleventh position as of 16 April 2019. Leading scorer Kevin Punter won the Champions League in 2018, while playing for AEK.

Brose Bamberg
After playing in EuroLeague Basketball competitions for years, Bamberg made its debut in the Champions League. It also won the 2019 BBL-Pokal in the 2018–19 season.

Iberostar Tenerife
Tenerife made its return to the Final Four for the second time, after winning the tournament in 2017.

Bracket

Semifinals

Segafredo Virtus Bologna vs Brose Bamberg

Iberostar Tenerife vs Telenet Giants Antwerp

Third place game

Final

Notes

References

External links 
 Basketball Champions League (official website)

2018–19 Basketball Champions League
Basketball Champions League Final Four
Basketball Champions League Final Four